Puya exigua is a species of plant in the family Bromeliaceae. It is endemic to Ecuador.  Its natural habitat is subtropical or tropical high-altitude grassland. It is threatened by habitat loss.

References

exigua
Endemic flora of Ecuador
Critically endangered flora of South America
Taxonomy articles created by Polbot